The 2009 AFC Champions League group stage was played from 10 March to 20 May 2009. A total of 32 teams competed in the group stage to decide the 16 places in the knock-out stage of the 2009 AFC Champions League.

Groups

Group A

Group B

Group C

Group D

Group E

Group F

Group G

Group H

References

Group stage